The women's javelin throw event at the 2005 European Athletics U23 Championships was held in Erfurt, Germany, at Steigerwaldstadion on 16 July.

Medalists

Results

Final
16 July

Participation
According to an unofficial count, 11 athletes from 7 countries participated in the event.

 (2)
 (1)
 (1)
 (3)
 (1)
 (2)
 (1)

References

Javelin throw
Javelin throw at the European Athletics U23 Championships